Serge Baguet (18 August 1969 – 9 February 2017) was a Belgian professional road bicycle racer.

Career
He was the son of the ex-cyclist Roger Baguet. He was married to Sandra Rasschaert and they have a son (Sam). Baguet started his professional cycling career in 1991. He worked for Lotto for five years and one year for Vlaanderen 2002. His major victories were stages in the Tour du Limousin and the Tour of Britain. After six years pro-cycling, he became a roofer.

In 2000, he made a comeback in the cycling-milieu (again with Lotto) and won his biggest victory in his career: a stage in the Tour de France. In 2005 he won two stages in the Vuelta a Andalucía and became Belgian national cycling champion.
In 2006 and 2007, Baguet rode for the second big Belgian UCI ProTeam: Quick Step-Innergetic. He retired at the end of the 2007 season.

Baguet died on 9 February 2017 after a two-year battle against colon cancer.

Major results

1989
 3rd Overall Circuit Franco-Belge
1990
 1st Stage 4 GP Tell
 2nd Seraing-Aachen-Seraing
 4th Gran Premio della Liberazione
 4th Circuit des Frontières
 6th Grote Prijs Jef Scherens
 7th Trophée des Grimpeurs
1991
 1st Tour du Nord-Ouest
 2nd GP Villafranca de Ordizia
 8th GP de la Ville de Rennes
 10th Rund um den Henninger Turm
1992
 2nd Cholet-Pays de Loire
 2nd GP Ouest–France
 3rd Overall Tour du Limousin
1st Stage 2
 5th Omloop van de Vlaamse Scheldeboorden
 7th Brabantse Pijl
 8th GP de la Ville de Rennes
1993
 1st Stage 2 Kellogg's Tour of Britain
 7th Brabantse Pijl
 10th La Flèche Wallonne
1994
 1st Clásica de Sabiñánigo
1995
 4th Grand Prix d'Isbergues
 6th Druivenkoers-Overijse
 10th Veenendaal–Veenendaal
2000
 3rd GP Stad Zottegem
 6th Coppa Bernocchi
2001
 1st Druivenkoers-Overijse
 1st Stage 17 Tour de France
 2nd Coppa Sabatini
 4th GP Ouest–France
 4th Grand Prix de Wallonie
 5th Clásica de San Sebastián
 5th Cholet-Pays de Loire
 6th Kuurne–Brussels–Kuurne
 8th Luk-Cup Bühl
 9th Overall Tour de Pologne
 9th Tour du Haut Var
 10th Nokere Koerse
2002
 2nd Kuurne–Brussels–Kuurne
 3rd Grand Prix Pino Cerami
 3rd Trofeo Laigueglia
 5th GP Industria & Commercio di Prato
 5th GP Stad Zottegem
 6th Brabantse Pijl
 6th Cholet-Pays de Loire
 8th Grote Prijs Jef Scherens
 8th GP Ouest–France
 9th Coppa Sabatini
2004
 2nd GP Ouest–France
2005
 1st  Road race, National Road Championships
 Vuelta a Andalucía
1st  Points classification
1st Stages 2 & 3 
 7th Kuurne–Brussels–Kuurne

References

External links

1969 births
2017 deaths
Belgian male cyclists
Belgian Tour de France stage winners
Cyclists from East Flanders
People from Brakel
Deaths from colorectal cancer